The 2019 Kilkenny Intermediate Hurling Championship was the 55th staging of the Kilkenny Intermediate Hurling Championship since its establishment by the Kilkenny County Board in 1929. The championship began on 21 September 2019 and ended on 27 October 2019.

On 27 October 2019, Tullaroan won the championship after a 3–18 to 0–21 defeat of Thomastown in the final at UPMC Nowlan Park. It was their second championship title overall and their first title since 1988.

Paul Holden from the Young Irelands club was the championship's top scorer with 2-40.

Team changes

To Championship

Promoted from the Kilkenny Junior Hurling Championship
 Dunnamaggin

Relegated from the Kilkenny Senior Hurling Championship
 Carrickshock

From Championship

Promoted to the Kilkenny Senior Hurling Championship
 Graigue-Ballycallan

Relegated to the Kilkenny Junior Hurling Championship
 Mooncoin

Results

First round

Relegation playoff

Quarter-finals

Semi-finals

Final

Championship statistics

Top scorers

Top scorers overall

Top scorers in a single game

References

External links
 Kilkenny GAA website

Kilkenny Intermediate Hurling Championship
Kilkenny Intermediate Hurling Championship